This is a list of schools in Winnipeg, Manitoba.

Winnipeg school divisions

 Louis Riel School Division
 Manitoba National School Division
 Pembina Trails School Division
River East Transcona School Division
 Seven Oaks School Division
St. James-Assiniboia School Division
Winnipeg School Division
Division Scolaire Franco-Manitobaine (Manitoba-wide division)

Post-secondary institutions

The provincial Department of Economic Development and Jobs is responsible for financial oversight, policy development, and accountability in Manitoba's post-secondary system, which includes post-secondary institutions in Winnipeg. The Department provides oversight to the province’s public post-secondary institutions, as well as providing grants to private religious institutions.

Public 
Canadian Mennonite University
Menno Simons College
Redekop School of Business
Red River College
Université de Saint-Boniface
École technique et professionnelle
University of Manitoba
St. Andrew's College
St. John's College
St. Paul's College
University of Winnipeg
 Manitoba College
 Menno Simons College
Manitoba Institute of Trades & Technology

Private 
Private religious institutions in Winnipeg include:

 Booth University College
 Providence University College and Theological Seminary

Private schools (K–12) 
 Balmoral Hall School
Beautiful Savior Lutheran School
Calvin Christian Collegiate
Casa Montessori and Orff School
Christ the King School
Faith Academy
Freedom International School
Gray Academy of Jewish Education
 Holy Ghost School
Hosanna Christian School
I. L. Peretz Folk School
Immanuel Christian School
The King's School
 Lake St. Martin School (Winnipeg Campus) – First Nations school
Linden Christian School
Mennonite Brethren Collegiate Institute (MBCI)
 Ohr HaTorah Day School
 Our Lady of Victory School
Paradise Montessori School
Red River Valley Junior Academy
Shawenim Abinooji School
Southeast Collegiate – First Nations school
Springs Christian Academy
St. Alphonsus School
St. Boniface Diocesan High School
St. Charles Catholic School
St. Emile Catholic School
St. Gerard School
St. Ignatius School
St. John Brebeuf School
St. John's-Ravenscourt School
 St. Mary's Academy
St. Maurice School
 St. Paul's High School
Twelve Tribes School
University of Winnipeg Collegiate
Westgate Mennonite Collegiate
Winnipeg Mennonite Elementary & Middle Schools
Winnipeg Montessori School Inc.

Public schools (K–12)

Early years and middle school

Mixed grades

Secondary schools

References

External links 

 City of Winnipeg School Divisions map
 Schools in Manitoba 2019/2020

Schools
Winnipeg